Bengali Portuguese Creole was an Indo-Portuguese creole spoken in various cities in Bengal: Calcutta, Balasore, Pipli, Chandernagore, Chittagong, Midnapore, Hugli and Dacca. The language was formed from contact between the Portuguese and Bengali languages. It is now extinct.

See also 
 Portuguese-based creole languages
 Indo-Portuguese creoles

References

Portuguese-based pidgins and creoles
Languages of India
Languages of Bangladesh
Portuguese language in Asia